Paul T. Buchheit is an American computer engineer and entrepreneur who created Gmail. He developed the original prototype of Google AdSense as part of his work on Gmail. He also suggested Google's former company motto Don't be evil in a 2000 meeting on company values, after the motto was initially coined in 1999 by engineer Amit Patel.

Early life and education
Buchheit grew up in New York. He attended Case Western Reserve University in Cleveland, Ohio where he studied computer science and rowed crew.

Career
Buchheit worked at Intel and later became the 23rd employee at Google. At Google he began developing Gmail in 2001, with its  innovations in search and storage. He also prompted what would become AdSense. Leaving Google in 2006, Buchheit started FriendFeed, which was launched in 2007 with partner Bret Taylor. FriendFeed was acquired by Facebook in 2009 in a private transaction that resulted in Buchheit being a Facebook employee.
In 2010, Buchheit left Facebook to become a partner at the investment firm Y Combinator. From 2006 (when he started investing) until 2008, Buchheit invested about $1.21 million in 32 different companies. and he left Facebook to become a full-time angel investor.

He continues to oversee angel investments of his own in "about 40" startups (by his own estimate) and is active with Y Combinator.

Philanthropy
In 2009, Buchheit set up Google Moderator to crowdsource ideas for the causes (501(c)3 non-profits) should benefit from his financial support. To quote him:

Buchheit has donated to various health organizations since the death of his 33-year-old brother from pancreatic cancer.

Buchheit has stated that he believes society has the technology and resources to provide adequate food, housing, education, and healthcare for everyone, using only a fraction of available labor and resources. In his view, this implies it is possible to put an end to wage slavery. Buchheit further stated:

Honors and awards
Buchheit won the 2011 The Economist innovation awards for the Computing and telecommunications field.

References 

American computer programmers
American bloggers
Living people
Gmail
Facebook employees
Google employees
Case Western Reserve University alumni
People from Webster, New York
Intel people
Sun Microsystems people
Microsoft employees
Winners of The Economist innovation awards
Y Combinator people
1977 births